iPhone is a line of smartphones by Apple Inc.

iPhone may also refer to:
iPhone models (oldest to newest):
iPhone (1st generation)
iPhone 3G
iPhone 3GS
iPhone 4
iPhone 4S
iPhone 5
iPhone 5C
iPhone 5S
iPhone 6
iPhone 6S
iPhone SE (1st generation)
iPhone 7
iPhone 8
iPhone X
iPhone XR
iPhone XS
iPhone 11
iPhone 11 Pro
iPhone SE (2nd generation)
iPhone 12
iPhone 12 Pro
iPhone 13
iPhone 13 Pro
iPhone SE (3rd generation)
iPhone 14
iPhone 14 Pro
 iphone, a line of Android-based smartphones sold by IGB Electronica
 iOS, formerly known as iPhone OS until June 2010, a mobile operating system made by Apple Inc.
 Linksys iPhone, an internet appliance and a VOIP phone by Cisco, launched by Infogear in 1998
 "iPhone" (song), 2020 song by Rico Nasty
 "iPhone", a song by DaBaby, featuring Nicki Minaj, from the album Kirk
 "iPhone", a song by the band Sparks from the album A Steady Drip, Drip, Drip

See also 

 iiPhone, the videophone by Bondwell